Kijiyama Dam is a hollow gravity dam located in Yamagata Prefecture in Japan. The dam is used for power production. The catchment area of the dam is 63 km2. The dam impounds about 60  ha of land when full and can store 8200 thousand cubic meters of water. The construction of the dam was started on 1957 and completed in 1960.

References

Dams in Yamagata Prefecture
1960 establishments in Japan